Arena Cugir is a multi-purpose stadium in Cugir, Romania. It is currently used mostly for football matches, is the home ground of CSO Cugir and has a capacity of 4,000 people (1,200 on seats). The stadium was opened in the 1930s and was known as Stadionul Metalurgistul, then as Arena CSO until the last renovation works, when the stadium was seriously modernized and renamed as Arena Cugir.

In Cugir, during the communist period was built another stadium, known also as Stadionul Metalurgistul, but mainly as Stadionul Nou or Stadionul Parc. The stadium has a capacity of 12,000 people and is owned by Cugir Mechanical Plant, but in the last years was abandoned due to high maintenance costs and its facilities, which were inconsistent with the needs of local sports clubs, being too large, outdated and difficult to modernize.

References

External links
Arena Cugir at soccerway.com
Arena Cugir at europlan-online.de

Football venues in Romania
Sport in Alba County
Buildings and structures in Alba County